"Asian Paradise" is a song by New Zealand singer and songwriter Sharon O'Neill. The song was released in April 1980 as the third single from her second studio album, Sharon O'Neill (1980)

Track listing 
New Zealand 7" (BA 461975) 
Side A "Asian Paradise" - 4:10
Side B "Ready to Love" - 2:27

Australian 7" (BA 222776) 
Side A "Asian Paradise" - 4:10
Side B "Awkward City"

Charts

When the Cat's Away version

In 2001, New Zealand female vocal group When the Cat's Away recorded a version of "Asian Paradise", featuring Sharon O'Neill. The song peaked debuted and peaked at number 16 in September 2001, surpassing the song's original peak in 1980.

Charts

References 

1979 songs
1980 singles
2001 singles
Sharon O'Neill songs
Songs written by Sharon O'Neill
Capitol Records singles